Baselius College, Kottayam (established in 1964) is a Malankara Orthodox college . It offers various graduate and under graduate courses. It is located in the heart Kottayam, Kerala, India. It is affiliated with Mahatma Gandhi University.

Notable alumni
 Justice V. G. Arun
 Manoj Kuroor, poet
 Guinness Pakru, actor
Kanam Rajendran, secretary CPI Kerala
 Unni R., novelist, short story writer and screenplay writer
 Thiruvanchoor Radhakrishnan, former Minister for Revenue, Government of Kerala
 Kummanam Rajasekharan

References

External links
 The official website of Baselius College
 The official Internet Radio of Baselius College

Educational institutions established in 1964
Oriental Orthodox universities and colleges
Universities and colleges in Kottayam
1964 establishments in Kerala
Arts and Science colleges in Kerala
Colleges affiliated to Mahatma Gandhi University, Kerala